Dus is a 2005 Indian Hindi-language action thriller film directed by Anubhav Sinha, based on the lives of seven fictional SIT (Indian Special Investigation) Team officers. It stars Sanjay Dutt, Sunil Shetty, Abhishek Bachchan, Zayed Khan, Shilpa Shetty, Esha Deol, Dia Mirza and Raima Sen.

Dus is a tribute to late celebrated director Mukul S. Anand, who had died while filming the incomplete 1997 film of the same title, which starred Dutt and Shetty with Salman Khan. It was a critical and commercial success.

Premise
The film follows the head of the fictional Anti-Terrorist Cell, played by Dutt, and his team, as they embark on a mission to prevent a deadly terrorist attack orchestrated by an international terrorist and criminal, Jamwaal, with only 7 days to do so. The incident was to take place on 10 May, thus explaining the name of the film.

Plot

Across the opening narration, Siddhant Dheer (Sanjay Dutt), the head of the Anti-Terrorist Cell (a fictional organisation based on the real-life Anti-Terrorism Squad and the Central Bureau of Investigation), reflects on how rampant terrorism has become in the world and goes on to tell the story of 7 of the hardest days in his life.

The ATC has a tip off about an impending terrorist attack on 10 May, targeting 20–25 thousand people. The man behind the plan is one Jamwaal, a hardened criminal who is feared by political figures and the law alike. Siddhant starts an unofficial investigation against Jamwaal. A goon named Altaf is arrested in connection to the case after the ATC defuses a bomb threat at a building.

Later, a woman is shot dead at her own home by an unknown assailant. Siddhant gets a tip from Neha, an undercover officer stationed by him in Canada, that an aide of Jamwaal named Himmat Mehendi has been arrested by the Canadian police. Siddhant sends his brother Shashank Dheer (Abhishek Bachchan) and his energetic partner, Aditya Singh (Zayed Khan), to apprehend Himmat, take him to a safe location pointed out by Neha, and extract information from him about Jamwaal and his plan. After attending his sister Anu's (Diya Mirza) engagement, Shashank and Aditya head to Canada on the same day. At the same time, Anu and her fiancé are kidnapped in lieu of Altaaf's release. Siddhant then realises that there is a terrorist informer in the ATC itself.

Meanwhile, in Canada, Aditya and Shashank are caught unawares when Aditya realises that the car they are travelling in has a bomb. He asks Shashank to drive fast as reducing the speed would detonate the bomb. A local police officer named Dan (Sunil Shetty) is meeting his estranged wife Priya (Raima Sen), trying to convince her to return to him after an incident that killed their baby while she was still pregnant. He sees them driving at top speed. He goes on to pursue them, much to Priya's anguish, resulting in a high speed car chase. Aditya and Shashank are able to escape and finally jump off the car as it travels a bridge, slows down, and explode. They then meet Neha, who reveals that she had planted the bomb in their car (having asked them by phone to get into it in the first place), calling it a test. The two go to her house and later manage to kidnap Himmat, who initially claims to them that he is "JD". Dan happens upon them again and now follows them to another bridge, where he pulls them over and roughly interrogates them, all the while refusing to believe who they really are. However, a hit squad appears on the bridge and attacks them. One of their bullets hits Dan on the shoulder while Aditya and Shashank react quickly enough to save his life and kill the men. Later, in custody, Himmat breaks down and tells them that everybody working for Jamwaal is a pawn who is expendable at any point. It is here that an initially skeptical Dan teams up with Aditya and Shashank in return for them saving his life, and the trio move to his house.

When Himmat claims that he does not know anything else, the team realizes that Himmat believes Jamwaal will save him, which is why he is not revealing sensitive information. They then stage an attempt on Himmat's life, and a scared Himmat informs them that the only people who pose any real danger to Jamwaal are Asif and Irfan, his friends turned foes, who betrayed him in order to foil his plan for 10 May. Himmat tells them that he knows where Asif might be. This leads the team to a disco, Asif's supposed hideout, where they question him alongside Himmat. Asif merely gives them Irfan's whereabouts and commits suicide. They then confront Irfan, believing him to be Jamwaal, and after killing his goons, kill him too. In India, Siddhant prepares a trap to rescue Anu. Anu's fiancé dies in blast, but Anu is saved, and the mole, Roy, is detained and commits suicide instead of suffering the indignity of going to prison, but not before revealing the codeword for the entire operation, "JEET". An enraged Siddhant learns from Altaf that the latter had been hired by Jamwaal to kill Asif and Irfan in Canada before the 10th. Siddhant decides to go to Canada, while his colleague and love interest, Aditi (Shilpa Shetty), decides to use Altaf as a bait to track down people in league with Jamwaal. As a result, many high-profile individuals and politicians are exposed.

Back in Canada, Himmat is set free. Shashank decides to propose to Neha and goes to her house along with Dan and Aditya. However, they find the house suspiciously empty and dark. Suddenly, they hear the footsteps of an intruder and confront him. They are shocked to find that the intruder is Siddhant, who tells them that Neha had been murdered a long time back. Now, it is revealed that the woman who was shot to death earlier was the real Neha. Siddhant explains that Jamwaal had Neha killed and replaced a fake Neha, since he had prior information to Aditya and Shashank's arrival in Canada (because of Roy). The day Altaf was arrested, Jamwaal suffered an accident and was arrested in a DUI. The real Neha, who had been following them at that point, only knew the real Himmat Mehendi, who had been with Jamwaal at the time and who had been killed by Irfan shortly after that event. It was his body which was found in Priya's car when she was about to divorce Dan. Furthermore, Jamwaal had wanted to kill his former friends while they were trying to kill him too (Asif having sent the hit squad on the bridge). But Altaf, his hired goon, was arrested by ATC. When he was kidnapped by the group while being assumed to be Himmat Mehendi, he kept the misunderstanding going and conned Aditya, Shashank, and Dan to do what he wanted Altaf to do, thus making his coast clear. This leads to one shocking reality : the person that the group had assumed to be Himmat Mehendi was the real Jamwaal.

Still clueless about Jamwaal's plan, the quartet, once again, focuses on "JEET". Siddhant figures that every letter in the word has something to do with its position in the English alphabet. J is 10, the date of the attack; E is 5, denoting the month of May; E denotes the time, 5 o' clock, and T is 20, which is still unknown. The group later receives information that a football match is supposed to take place at a nearby stadium on that date, and the Prime Minister of India has been invited there as the Chief Guest, to be felicitated by the 20-25 thousand people present.

Realizing that this stadium will be bombed on the fateful day at 5 o'clock, the quartet turns up at the stadium and splits up. Early in the piece,  Siddhant is captured by the stadium guards, who were in on the plan. Aditya finds the bomb on a car whose registration number ends with the number 20 (thus explaining T in JEET), the timer having also been set at 20 minutes. He drives the car outside the stadium while Shashank finds another bomb of the same size and takes it to a nearby flying club, where he runs into the fake Neha, who confesses that she has fallen in love with him. They load the bombs into a small plane, with Shashank deciding to dispose of the bomb off in a deserted area, away from city limits. Dan enters the stadium by another route, only to end up being taken hostage along with his estranged wife and some school children she is escorting. Dan somehow rescues his wife and the children, while Siddhant manages to escape and kill some goons despite being temporarily blinded. As both heads to different directions to find Jamwaal, the latter is informed by his men that both the bombs have been taken away and that the mission has failed.  Jamwaal tries to escape from the building, only to run into Siddhant. As Siddhant doesn't appear to know him, Jamwaal nearly succeeds in escaping by pretending to be someone else, but Siddhant calls him on his bluff.

Here, Shashank realizes that he has too little time to dispose off the second bomb safely, and decides to crash the plane along with himself and the fake Neha, much to the group's anguish. He bids an emotional farewell to the others on radio and then crashes the plane into a nearby lake. Meanwhile, Aditya is in trouble too, because he is running out of time and does not know where to dispose of the bomb. Siddhant is distraught by the turn of events. Dan calls for help, with which he succeeds in rescuing Aditya just moments before the jeep explodes in a valley. Jamwaal tries to escape, but is tracked down and shot dead by Siddhant in an elevator.

The film ends as Shashank's ashes are immersed in the river while Siddhant laments that while everything had returned to normal after those 7 days, it had come at the great expense of his brother's life.

Cast
Sanjay Dutt as Siddhant Dheer
Suniel Shetty as Danish Walia / Dan  
Abhishek Bachchan as Shashank Dheer
Zayed Khan as Aditya Singh
Shilpa Shetty as Aditi 
Diya Mirza as Anu Dheer
Esha Deol as fake ATC Agent Neha
Raima Sen as Priya Walia , Dan's wife.
Gulshan Grover as Irfan / Jamwal
Pankaj Kapur as Himmat Mehndi / JD / Jamwal
Rajendra Sethi as Altaf
Ninad Kamat as Agent Roy
Delhi Ganesh as Suryakant Raidu
Anjan Srivastav as Bose
Mayte Garcia as the lead singer and dancer in Deedar de song.

Production
Dus is a tribute to celebrated director Mukul S. Anand, who had died while filming the 1997 incomplete film of the same name, and which had also starred Sanjay Dutt alongside Salman Khan. Shah Rukh Khan was also reportedly set to star in the film. The film had a plot involving terrorism in Kashmir, along with Sylvester Stallone-style action scenes. However, the 1997 film was cancelled after Anand's death. The 2005 endeavour is a different film, with a different plot, only sharing the producer, Nitin Manmohan, in common.

Box office
According to Box Office India, it had an excellent opening. It was the tenth highest-grossing film of the year 2005.

Soundtrack

The music is composed by Vishal–Shekhar. Lyrics are penned by Panchhi Jalonvi and Mehboob. According to the Indian trade website Box Office India, with around 17,00,000 units sold, this film's soundtrack album was the year's sixth highest-selling.
The song "Dus Bahane" was reportedly the most played song in 2005. The song "Dus Bahane" was recreated as "Dus Bahane 2.0" for Baaghi 3 (2020) by Vishal–Shekhar, marking the first time  the duo recreated their own song. The song "Deedar De" was later recreated for  Chhalaang (2020).

Track listing

Awards and nominations

References

External links

2005 films
Films about terrorism in India
2000s Hindi-language films
2000s spy thriller films
2005 action thriller films
Films directed by Anubhav Sinha
Films set in Canada
Indian spy thriller films
Films scored by Vishal–Shekhar
Indian action thriller films